Le Tonnelier or Tonnellier literally means "cooper" in French.

The surname may refer to:

Le Tonnelier de Breteuil
Louis Auguste Le Tonnelier de Breteuil
Louis Nicolas le Tonnelier de Breteuil
François Victor Le Tonnelier de Breteuil
David Tonnellier, Canadian curler

French-language surnames